Gray Court is a town in Laurens County, South Carolina, United States. The population was 795 at the 2010 census. It is part of the Greenville–Mauldin–Easley Metropolitan Statistical Area.

History

Gray Court was incorporated as a town in 1899.

The Gray Court-Owings School was listed on the National Register of Historic Places in 2004.

Geography
Gray Court is located at  (34.608563, -82.114189). The town lies between the cities of Fountain Inn and Laurens, South Carolina along highway 14 and 385. Its closest neighbor is the village of Owings, which lies about one mile to the north.

Demographics

2020 census

As of the 2020 United States census, there were 763 people, 322 households, and 185 families residing in the town.

2000 census
As of the census of 2000, there were 1,021 people, 371 households, and 270 families residing in the town. The population density was 551.0 people per square mile (213.1/km2). There were 398 housing units at an average density of 214.8 per square mile (83.1/km2). The racial makeup of the town was 37.81% White, 54.65% African American, 0.20% Native American, 0.10% Asian, 6.66% from other races, and 0.59% from two or more races. Hispanic or Latino of any race were 9.50% of the population.

There were 371 households, out of which 31.8% had children under the age of 18 living with them, 41.8% were married couples living together, 21.6% had a female householder with no husband present, and 27.2% were non-families. 24.3% of all households were made up of individuals, and 11.1% had someone living alone who was 65 years of age or older. The average household size was 2.75 and the average family size was 3.15.

In the town, the population was spread out, with 26.9% under the age of 18, 10.3% from 18 to 24, 28.4% from 25 to 44, 22.2% from 45 to 64, and 12.1% who were 65 years of age or older. The median age was 34 years. For every 100 females, there were 98.6 males. For every 100 females age 18 and over, there were 93.3 males.

The median income for a household in the town was $31,146, and the median income for a family was $34,545. Males had a median income of $22,639 versus $19,648 for females. The per capita income for the town was $13,066. About 16.4% of families and 20.5% of the population were below the poverty line, including 29.8% of those under age 18 and 16.3% of those age 65 or over.

Government

2019 mayoral election

External links
Information about Gray Court from Laurens County
ACCESS 15 Laurens County Public, educational, and government access (PEG) cable TV channel
 The Gray Court-Owings Historical Society

References

Towns in Laurens County, South Carolina
Towns in South Carolina
Upstate South Carolina